Jean Palairet (1697–1774) was a French cartographer.

Life
Jean Palairet was born in Montauban, but emigrated to England. He worked as an agent in London for the French States General, and taught French to the children of George II.

While working as London agent for Jacob Boreel, Palairet apparently played a part in introducing the game of cricket to the Netherlands: in 1765 he sent four balls and 12 bats to the Netherlands, and attempted to find a copy of a rule-book for the game.

Works
 Nouvelle méthode pour apprendre à bien lire, et à bien orthographier, 1727
 A short treatise on the arts and sciences, in French and English, 1736
 A new Royal French grammar containing rules for the pronouncing and writing of the French tongue, 1738
 Nouvelle introduction à la géographie moderne, 1754
 Atlas méthodique composé pour l'usage de son altesse sérénissime monseigneur le prince d'Orange et de Nassau, Stadhouder des Sept Provinces-Unies, 1755
 Carte des Possessions Angloises et Francoises d'Amerique septentrionale, 1755
 A concise description of the English and French possessions in North-America for the better explaining of the map published with that title, 1755

References

1697 births
1774 deaths
French geographers